St Bartholomew's Church is in the town of Great Harwood in Lancashire, England. It is an active Anglican parish church in the Diocese of Blackburn. The church is recorded in the National Heritage List for England as a designated Grade II* listed building.

History
Historically, the township of Great Harwood was part of the ecclesiastical parish of Blackburn. There is mention of a parochial chapel of ease dedicated to St Lawrence at Great Harwood in sources from 1389. A chantry to St Lawrence's was later formed by Thomas Hesketh of Martholme, and dedicated to St Bartholomew. The dedication of the chapel was subsequently changed to St Bartholomew.

The tower of the present building probably dates from the 15th century. Most of the rest of the church appears to date from the 16th century and may have been rebuilt by Thomas Hesketh of Martholme, who made additions to his home at that time. In 1880–81 the Lancaster architects Paley and Austin added a bay to the nave, a new chancel, a vestry, an organ chamber and a pulpit. The seating was increased from 377 to 470. These alterations cost £2,000.

Architecture

Exterior
St Bartholomew's is built in the Perpendicular style in coursed rubble, with roofs of stone slate.  Its plan consists of a nave with a west tower, aisles and a chancel to the east. There is a porch to the south and a vestry to the north. The tower has four stages and diagonal buttresses. There is a stair turret at the south east corner, and a crenellated parapet. There is a three-light west window under a pointed arch head, with a moulding. There are two-light belfry louvres with moulding.

The nave and aisles have three-light windows with stone mullions In the south wall of the chancel there are two two-light windows. The east window has four lights and Perpendicular-style tracery.

Interior and fittings

There is a 19th-century reredos, now in the tower, that depicts the Annunciation. There is 17th-century octagonal baptismal font. Stained glass in the church includes work by Henry Holiday, Ballantine & Gardner and A. Seward & Co.

The Lanterns in the main church were recently updated to LED by Electrical & Building Solutions with the assistance of Saturn Lighting Bolton, which has enabled a great energy saving and increase in the quality of artificial light in the space without changing the look or feel of the main hall.

External features
St Bartholomew's churchyard extension contains the war graves of two soldiers and an airman of World War I.

Assessment and administration
St Bartholomew's was designated a Grade II* listed building on 11 July 1966. The Grade II* designation is the second highest of the three grades of listed buildings.

An active parish church in the Church of England, St Batholomew's is part of the diocese of Blackburn, which is in the Province of York. It is in the archdeaconry of Blackburn and the Deanery of Whalley.

See also

Listed buildings in Great Harwood
Grade II* listed buildings in Lancashire
List of ecclesiastical works by Paley and Austin

References
Citations

Sources

External links

Buildings and structures in Hyndburn
Church of England church buildings in Lancashire
Diocese of Blackburn
Grade II* listed churches in Lancashire
Great Harwood
Paley and Austin buildings